Acomb may refer to:

Acomb, Northumberland
Acomb, North Yorkshire
Acomb Park, suburb in York, England
Acomb Stakes, horse race in York, England
Doug Acomb (born 1949), Canadian ice hockey player